The Schwarzer See ("Black Lake") is a lake in the Rheinsberg Lake Region in the German state of Brandenburg. It lies within the municipality of Rheinsberg.

See also
Großer Prebelowsee
Großer Zechliner See
Tietzowsee
Zootzensee

Lakes of Brandenburg
Ostprignitz-Ruppin
Federal waterways in Germany
LSchwarzerSee